List of the members of the Faroese Løgting in the period 1978–1980. The parliament had 32 members this period. The Social Democratic Party and the Union Party were the largest parties with 8 members each, followed by Republic and People's Party with 6 members each. Self-Government Party and Progress Party had 2 members each.

References 

Løgtingið 150 – Hátíðarrit, vol. 2 (2002). (PDF)

 1978
1978 in the Faroe Islands
1979 in the Faroe Islands
1980 in the Faroe Islands
1978–1980